Jan Denef (born 4 September 1951) is a Belgian mathematician. He is an Emeritus Professor of Mathematics at the Katholieke Universiteit Leuven (KU Leuven).

Denef obtained his PhD from KU Leuven in 1975 with a thesis on Hilbert's tenth problem; his advisors were Louis Philippe Bouckaert and Willem Kuijk.

He is a specialist of model theory, number theory and algebraic geometry. He is well known for his early work on Hilbert's tenth problem and for developing the theory of motivic integration in a series of papers with François Loeser. He has also worked on computational number theory.

Recently he proved a conjecture of Jean-Louis Colliot-Thélène which generalizes the Ax–Kochen theorem.

In 2002 Denef was an Invited Speaker at the International Congresses of Mathematicians in Beijing.  His Hirsch-index is 24.

References

Publications

External links 
 
 

1951 births
Living people
20th-century  Belgian mathematicians
21st-century  Belgian mathematicians
Model theorists
Academic staff of KU Leuven
KU Leuven alumni